The 2014 Vietnam Open Grand Prix is the twelfth Vietnam Open grand prix gold and grand prix tournament of the 2014 BWF Grand Prix Gold and Grand Prix. The tournament is held in Tan Binh Sports Center, Ho Chi Minh City, Vietnam September 1–7, 2014 and has a total purse of $50,000.

Players by nation

Men's singles

Seeds 

  Dionysius Hayom Rumbaka (champion)
  Sony Dwi Kuncoro (withdrew)
  Nguyen Tien Minh (semi-final)
  Wong Wing Ki (first round)
  Prannoy Kumar (final)
  Ng Ka Long (quarter-final)
  Suppanyu Avihingsanon (third round)
  Mohd Arif Abdul Latif (quarter-final)
  Andre Kurniawan Tedjono (quarter-final)
  Tan Chun Seang (semi-final)
  Riichi Takeshita (first round)
  Zulfadli Zulkiffli (third round)
  Shih Kuei-chun (withdrew)
  Chan Yan Kit (first round)
  Ajay Jayaram (third round)
  Iskandar Zulkarnain Zainuddin (third round)

Finals

Top half

Section 1

Section 2

Section 3

Section 4

Bottom half

Section 5

Section 6

Section 7

Section 8

Women's singles

Seeds 

  Hsu Ya-ching (quarter-final)
  Pai Yu-po (quarter-final)
  Maria Febe Kusumastuti (quarter-final)
  Adriyanti Firdasari (quarter-final)
  Kaori Imabeppu (semi-final)
  Yang Li Lian (second round)
  Millicent Wiranto (first round)
  Iris Wang (second round)

Finals

Top half

Section 1

Section 2

Bottom half

Section 3

Section 4

Men's doubles

Seeds 

  Wahyu Nayaka / Ade Yusuf (quarter-final)
  Chooi Kah Ming / Teo Ee Yi (second round)
  Huang Po-jui / Lu Ching-yao (quarter-final)
  Jagdish Singh / Roni Tan Wee Long (first round)
  Ronald Alexander / Alfian Eko Prasetya (semi-final)
  Selvanus Geh / Kevin Sanjaya Sukamuljo (second round)
  Andrei Adistia / Hendra Aprida Gunawan (champion)
  Kenta Kazuno / Kazushi Yamada (final)

Finals

Top half

Section 1

Section 2

Bottom half

Section 3

Section 4

Women's doubles

Seeds 

  Jongkonphan Kittiharakul / Rawinda Prajongjai (second round)
  Shendy Puspa Irawati / Vita Marissa (second round)
  Dian Fitriani / Nadya Melati (quarter-final)
  Keshya Nurvita Hanadia / Devi Tika Permatasari (second round)

Finals

Top half

Section 1

Section 2

Bottom half

Section 3

Section 4

Mixed doubles

Seeds 

  Muhammad Rijal / Vita Marissa (champion)
  Irfan Fadhilah / Weni Anggraini (final)
  Anatoliy Yartsev / Evgeniya Kosetskaya (first round)
  Alfian Eko Prasetya / Annisa Saufika (quarter-final)
  Lin Chia-yu / Wu Ti-jung (first round)
  Wong Fai Yin / Chow Mei Kuan (quarter-final)
  Wong Wai Hong / Chan Hung Yung (first round)
  Yonathan Suryatama Dasuki / Variella Aprilsasi (quarter-final)

Finals

Top half

Section 1

Section 2

Bottom half

Section 3

Section 4

References 

Vietnam Open (badminton)
2014 in Vietnamese sport
Vietnam Open Grand Prix
Vietnam Open Grand Prix